"Anne Hathaway" is a poem by Carol Ann Duffy about Anne Hathaway, the wife of William Shakespeare.

Overview
This poem, a sonnet, appears in The World's Wife, published in 1999, a collection of poems.  The poem is based on the famous passage from Shakespeare's will regarding his "second-best bed". Duffy chooses the view that this would be their marriage bed, and so a memento of their love, not a slight. Anne remembers their lovemaking as a form of "romance and drama", unlike the "prose" written on the best bed used by guests, "I hold him in the casket of my widow's head/ as he held me upon that next best bed".

In The Second Best Bed and the Legacy of Anne Hathaway, Katherine Scheil describes it as "… [centering] on an intimate relationship between the Shakespeares and the second best bed: 'The bed we loved in was a spinning world / of forests, castles, torchlight, clifftops, seas / where he would dive for pearls' while 'In the other bed, the best, our guests dozed on, / dribbling their prose'". She sees Duffy's poem as belonging to a category of recent takes on Anne Hathaway that "… have used the 'second- best bed' as an inspiration for imagining some sort of connection (emotional, sexual, or both) between the Shakespeares."

Notes and references

Notes

References

Bibliography
 

1999 poems
Poetry by Carol Ann Duffy
Cultural depictions of William Shakespeare